Incantation are a musical group playing traditional tribal and other South American music. The band started in 1981 from a pool of musicians who were, at the time, playing all kinds of different types of music for the (then) Ballet Rambert, based in London. A new ballet was choreographed (called "Ghost Dances") about political oppression in South America, to the music of Inti-Illimani, the exiled Chilean folk group. The company preferred to use live musicians (rather than tapes) for performances, and six of the musicians volunteered.

Authentic instruments were procured, and some time was spent perfecting how to play them. The show was a hit and before long the band was offered a recording contract by Coda Records, a subsidiary of Beggars Banquet Records. Incantation was chosen as the band's name, based on the word "Inca".

Members of the various incarnations of the band include Tony Hinnigan (Scottish), Mike Taylor (Irish), Forbes Henderson (English), Simon Rogers (English), Chris Swithinbank, and Chileans Claudia Figuerora, Sergio Avila and Mauricio Venegas. They achieved success in the UK Singles Chart in 1982 with the top twenty hit "Cacharpaya (Andes Pumpsa Daesi)". They later contributed the traditional instruments (including pan pipes) to the soundtracks of the films Willow and Field of Dreams (both scored by James Horner), as well as The Mission (scored by Ennio Morricone) and A Handful of Dust (scored by George Fenton).

Discography

Studio albums

Compilation albums

Singles

References

External links
 
 Incantation fan site with biography and discography
 Tony Hinnigan website - One of Incantation's founding members
 An official band website for their 2012 album - "Atacama"

Musical groups established in 1981
British world music groups